This is the list of tourist attractions in Taipei, capital city of Taiwan.

Notable buildings before 1945 

 Chin Shan Yen Hui Chi Temple (Shilin)
 Ciyou Temple (Songshan)
 Dalongdong Baoan Temple (Datong)
 Guo Ziyi Memorial Hall
 Guandu Temple (Beitou)
 Lin An Tai Historical House and Museum (Zhongshan)
 Linji Huguo Chan Temple (Zhongshan)
 Lungshan Temple (Wanhua)
 National Taiwan Normal University: Lecture and Recital Hall (Daan/Guting)
 National Taiwan University: Library (Gongguan)
 National Taiwan University: Original Hospital (Zhongzheng)
 Shandao Temple (Zhongzheng)
 North Gate (Zhongzheng)
 Presidential Office Building (Zhongzheng)
 Qingshui Temple (Wanhua)
 Shennong Temple (Shilin)
 Taipei Confucius Temple (Datong)
 Xiahai City God Temple (Datong)
 Ximen Redhouse (Wanhua)
 Yangmingshan Historical Structures
 Zhinan Temple (Wenshan)

Notable buildings since 1945 
 Chiang Kai-shek Memorial Hall at Liberty Square  (Zhongzheng)
 Former American Consulate in Taipei (Zhongshan)
 Guling Street Avant-garde Theatre (Zhongzheng)
 National Revolutionary Martyrs' Shrine (Zhongshan)
 National Theater and Concert Hall at Liberty Square  (Zhongzheng)
 Nung Chan Monastery (Beitou)
 Shin Kong Life Tower (Zhongzheng)
 Sun Yat-sen Memorial Hall (Xinyi)
 Taipei 101 (Xinyi)
 Xingtian Temple (Zhongshan)

Museums 

 Aurora Art Museum (Songshan)
 Beitou Hot Spring Museum (Beitou)
 Chang Foundation Museum (Zhongzheng)
 Cheng Kung Senior High School Insect Museum (Zhongzheng)
 Cheng Nan-jung Liberty Museum (Songshan)
 Children's Art Museum in Taipei (Shilin)
 Children's Museum of Transportation (Zhongzheng)
 China Ceramics Museum (Beitou)
 Customs Museum (Datong)
 Dadaocheng Puppet Theatre Museum (Datong)
 Fire Safety Museum of Taipei City Fire Department (Neihu)
 Fo Guang Yuan Art Gallery (Songshan)
 Forestry Exhibition Hall (Zhongzheng)
 Hong-gah Museum (Beitou)
 Hwa Kang Museum (Shilin)
 Ketagalan Culture Center (Beitou)
 Lin An Tai Historical House and Museum (Zhongshan)
 Lin Liu-hsin Puppet Theatre Museum (Datong)
 Miniatures Museum of Taiwan (Zhongshan)
 Museum of Contemporary Art Taipei (Datong)
 Museum of the Institute of History and Philosophy, Academia Sinica (Nangang)
 Museum of Jade Art (Zhongshan)
 National Museum of History, Nanhai Campus (Zhongzheng)
 National Palace Museum (Shilin)
 National Taiwan Museum (Zhongzheng)
 National Taiwan Science Education Center (Shilin)
 Postal Museum (Zhongzheng)
 Republic of China Armed Forces Museum (Zhongzheng)
 Robot Museum (Beitou)
 Shung Ye Museum of Formosan Aborigines (Shilin)
 Suho Memorial Paper Museum (Zhongshan)
 Taipei 228 Memorial Museum (Zhongzheng)
 Taipei Artist Village (Zhongzheng)
 Taipei Astronomical Museum (Shilin)
 Taipei Fine Arts Museum (Zhongshan)
 Taipei Story House (Zhongshan)
 Taipei Water Park (Zhongzheng)
 Taiwan Folk Arts Museum (Beitou)
 Taiwan Land Reform Museum
 Taiwan Storyland (Zhongzheng)
 Taiwan Television Exposition (Songshan)
 Tittot Glass Art Museum (Beitou)
 Wan Fang Arts Museum (Wenshan)
 Wei Chin-Yuan Musical Instruments Museum (Songshan)
 YuYuYang Museum (Zhongzheng)

Public places
 Digital Art Center, Taipei (Shilin)
 Discovery Center of Taipei (Xinyi)
 Taipei Hakka Culture Hall (Daan)
 Heritage and Culture Education Center of Taipei (Wanhua)
 Liberty Square: Plaza and Parks
 Novel Hall for Performing Arts (Xinyi)
 Puppetry Art Center of Taipei (Songshan)
 Taipei Children's Recreation Center (Zhongshan)
 Taipei Costume Cultural Center (Wanhua)
 Taipei Cultural Center (Songshan)
 Young Party (Zhongzheng)

Urban parks 
 228 Peace Memorial Park (Zhongzheng)
 Daan Forest Park (Daan)
 Dahu Park  (Neihu)
 Liberty Square: Parks
 Shilin Residence Park and Gardens (Shilin)
 Taipei Botanical Garden (Zhongzheng)
 Taipei Zoo (Wenshan)

National park and nature preserve
 Yangmingshan

Night markets 

 Dihua Street (迪化街) (Datong)
 Gongguan Night Market (公館夜市)
 Huaxi Street Tourist Night Market (Snake Alley) (華西街)(Wanhua)
 Jingmei Night Market (景美夜市) (Wenshan)
 Liaoning Street Night Market (遼寧街夜市) (Zhongshan)
 Ningxia Night Market (寧夏夜市) (Datong)
 Raohe Street Night Market (饒河街觀光夜市) (Songshan)
 Shida Night Market (師大夜市) (Daan)
 Shilin Night Market (士林夜市) (Shilin)
 Tonghua Night Market (通化街夜市) (Daan)
 Ximending (西門町) (Wanhua)

Others

 Beitou Hot Springs (Beitou)
 Dihua Street (Datong)
 Dadaocheng Wharf (Datong)
 Maokong (Wenshan)

See also
 List of tourist attractions in Taiwan

Attractions

Tourist attractions
Taipei
Taipei